Esmailiyeh may refer to:

 Esmailiyeh-ye Olya, Kerman Province
 Esmailiyeh-ye Sofla, Kerman Province
 Esmailiyeh 1, Khuzestan Province
 Esmailiyeh 2, Khuzestan Province
 Esmailiyeh Rural District, in Khuzestan Province

See also
 Isma'iliyya (disambiguation)